The Digital Pathology Association (DPA), is a non-profit organization of professionals in the field of pathology and related technologies. It has over 2,000 members and is headquartered in Carmel, Indiana.

Founded in 2009, the DPA's primary achievement has been to work with the FDA to develop a framework for clearance to market whole slide imaging systems. The DPA provides educational resources at its web site as well as hosting an annual scientific and educational conference, Pathology Visions.

See also
 Pathology
 Anatomic pathology
 Digital pathology

References

External links
 Digital Pathology Association

Medical associations based in the United States
Pathology organizations